Rudi Vingerhoets (born 3 May 1958) is a Belgian former breaststroke swimmer. He competed in two events at the 1972 Summer Olympics.

References

External links
 

1958 births
Living people
Belgian male breaststroke swimmers
Olympic swimmers of Belgium
Swimmers at the 1972 Summer Olympics
Place of birth missing (living people)